Valentine and Sons was a printing company founded in Dundee, Scotland in 1851 by James Valentine (1815–1879), that grew to become Scotland's leading manufacturer of picture postcards.

Following James Valentine's death the company was run by his sons, William Dobson Valentine (1844–1907) and George Valentine (1852–1890).

The company was purchased by John Waddington Limited in 1963, who sold it in turn to Hallmark Cards in 1980. Valentine and Sons' operations ceased in 1994.

References

External links 
 Postcards at Toronto Public Library
 James Valentine Photographic Collection at the University of St Andrews

Postcard publishers
British printers
Companies based in Dundee
Publishing companies established in 1851
1851 establishments in Scotland